The Pahiatua by-election of 1977 was a by-election for the electorate of Pahiatua on 30 April 1977 during the 38th New Zealand Parliament.

Background
The by-election resulted from the resignation of the previous member Sir Keith Holyoake when he was appointed Governor-General.

Candidates
Labour
The Labour Party had seven candidates including:

Trevor de Cleene, a Palmerston North City Councillor and Labour's candidate for Pahiatua in 
Dr Alan Levatt, a sociology lecturer at Victoria University
Paul Thornicroft, Labour's candidate for Pahiatua in 

Levatt, who earned his Ph.D. from Michigan University and had previously lectured in American universities, was selected as the candidate.

National
Five candidates were shortlisted for the National nomination.

Graham Percy Adam, a company director and former Mayor of Eketahuna
Garth Cassidy, a managing director from Waipukurau and member of the Hawkes Bay Harbour Board
John Falloon, a farmer from Masterton and the meat and wool chairman for the Wairarapa branch of Federated Farmers
Hamish Kynoch, a farmer from Ashley Clinton and runner-up for Young Farmer of the Year in 1972
Weston Macpherson, a farmer and chairman of the Norsewood branch of Federated Farmers.

At a selection meeting in the Pahiatua Town Hall four ballots were taken of National members. Kynoch was initially the frontrunner to win the nomination and lead the voting until the final ballot which selected Falloon as the candidate.

Values
The Values Party selected Peter McHugh as its candidate.

Results
The following table gives the election results:

Notes

References

By-elections in New Zealand
1977 elections in New Zealand
Politics of Manawatū-Whanganui
April 1977 events in New Zealand